Brave and Crazy is the second album by singer-songwriter Melissa Etheridge, released in 1989 (see 1989 in music). As of 2010, the album has sold  632,000 copies in the United States alone, according to Nielsen SoundScan.

Track listing
All tracks written by Melissa Etheridge, except where noted.

"No Souvenirs" – 4:33
"Brave and Crazy" – 4:37
"You Used to Love to Dance" – 5:33
"The Angels" – 4:38
"You Can Sleep While I Drive" – 3:14
"Testify" (Etheridge, Kevin McCormick) – 4:28
"Let Me Go" – 3:56
"My Back Door" – 4:24
"Skin Deep" – 3:10
"Royal Station 4/16" – 7:08

Note
The album lists the running time of two songs incorrectly: "You Used to Love to Dance" actually runs 5:33 (not 4:33) and "Royal Station 4/16" runs 7:08 (not 6:40). The correct times are printed on the disc itself.

Personnel
Melissa Etheridge – vocals, twelve-string guitar, producer, arranger
Bono – harmonica
Bernie Larsen – electric guitar
Mauricio-Fritz Lewak – drums
Kevin McCormick – bass guitar, producer, arranger
Scott Thurston – keyboards
Waddy Wachtel – guitar

Production
Niko Bolas – producer, mixing, engineer
 Niko Bolas, Bob Vogt – engineer, 
 Tom Banghart – assistant engineer
 Larry Goodwin – assistant engineer
 Randy Wine – assistant engineer
Dennis Keeley – photography
Robin Fredriksz – make-up

Charts

Certifications and sales

Notes

References

Melissa Etheridge albums
1989 albums
Albums produced by Niko Bolas
Island Records albums